Pegging may refer to:

 Pegging (sexual practice)
 Pegging (cribbage)
 Pegging report, a manufacturing record
 Tight rolled pants (pegged pants), in fashion
 The act of setting a fixed exchange rate between two currencies
 The act of demarcating a mining claim

See also
 PEG (disambiguation)
 Pigging, a maintenance operation in pipelines
Tent pegging, an equestrian sport